is a retired Japanese professional pitcher.

External links

Living people
1964 births
Baseball people from Yamaguchi Prefecture
Nippon Professional Baseball pitchers
Yomiuri Giants players
Medalists at the 1984 Summer Olympics
Olympic baseball players of Japan
Olympic gold medalists for Japan
Japanese baseball coaches
Nippon Professional Baseball coaches